Talk Talk were an English band formed in 1981, led by Mark Hollis (vocals, guitar, piano), Lee Harris (drums), and Paul Webb (bass). The group achieved early chart success with the synth-pop singles "Talk Talk" (1982), "It's My Life", and "Such a Shame" (both 1984) before moving towards a more experimental approach informed by jazz and free improvisation in the mid-1980s, pioneering what became known as post-rock. Talk Talk achieved widespread critical success in Europe and the UK with the singles "Life's What You Make It" (1985) and "Living in Another World" (1986); in 1988, they released their fourth album Spirit of Eden, which was critically acclaimed but commercially unsuccessful.

Friction with the band's label, EMI, resulted in legal action and countersuing. Webb departed, and the band switched to Polydor for their final studio album, 1991's Laughing Stock, but split soon afterwards. Singer Mark Hollis released one solo album in 1998 before retiring from the music industry; he died in 2019. The band's founding bass player and drummer, Paul Webb and Lee Harris, played in several bands together; long-term collaborator Tim Friese-Greene continued in the business as a musician and producer.

History

1981–1983: Formation 

Talk Talk began as a quartet consisting of Mark Hollis, formerly from The Reaction (vocals/main songwriter), Lee Harris (drums), Paul Webb (bass guitar), and Simon Brenner (keyboards). In their early years they were often compared with Duran Duran. In addition to a band name consisting of a repeated word, the two shared a Roxy Music-inspired musical direction, as well as the same record label (EMI) and producer (Colin Thurston). The band also supported Duran Duran on tour in late 1981.

The band released their first single, "Mirror Man", on EMI in February 1982. The single was not a great success, but was quickly followed by their self-titled single in April 1982 (a rerecording of a track by The Reaction) which reached No. 52 in the UK. The band's first album, titled The Party's Over, was released in July 1982. The band had their first UK Top 40 hits with the singles "Today" (UK No. 14) and a re-release of "Talk Talk" (UK No. 23). These singles also were hits in other countries including Ireland, South Africa, Australia and New Zealand. The re-release of the "Talk Talk" single reached the U.S. Top 75. The album was produced by Colin Thurston, who was Duran Duran's in-house EMI producer at the time, but picked by Hollis because of his involvement with David Bowie's Heroes. It was a moderate success in the UK reaching No. 21, and was later certified Silver by the BPI for sales of 60,000 copies by 1985. It was a Top 10 hit in New Zealand.

Brenner left after the 1983 non-LP hit single "My Foolish Friend", which was produced by frequent Roxy Music collaborator Rhett Davies. At this point, Talk Talk was now a trio, as Brenner was never officially replaced. However, Tim Friese-Greene was recruited to assist with the recording of their second album, It's My Life, and he became the band's producer as well as keyboardist and Hollis' songwriting partner. Although a major contributor to the band's studio output and a de facto fourth member, Friese-Greene never officially joined the band.  As such, he did not play with the touring band on live dates, and was absent from the band's publicity material.

1984–1986: Commercial success 

Although major success eluded them in the UK, Talk Talk achieved considerable international success in 1984/85, particularly in continental Europe, North America and New Zealand, with the album It's My Life. The accompanying single "Such a Shame" (inspired by the book The Dice Man) became a Top 10 hit in Austria, Italy, France, Germany, Netherlands and Switzerland during this period. The title track of the album entered the U.S., Canadian, French, German, New Zealand and Netherlands Top 40. A third single, "Dum Dum Girl", was a success in some European countries and in New Zealand; however, the album and its singles were largely ignored in the UK. Commercial success notwithstanding, the band made deliberate choices that moved them away from the mainstream. The music video for "It's My Life", for instance, featured a grumpy Hollis who mocks lip-synching; after EMI protested, they re-shot the video, turning it into "a total piss-take of lip-synching", in Alan McGee's words.

The artist James Marsh designed the first cover image for It's My Life based on the band's name. He followed the theme for subsequent singles, remaining the band's artistic frontman and creating all their covers and posters throughout their career.

Talk Talk abandoned the synthpop style completely with their third album, 1986's The Colour of Spring. It became their biggest success in the UK, making the Top 10 (and certified Gold by the BPI for sales over 100,000 copies), in part due to the Top 20 single "Life's What You Make It", which was also successful internationally. Another single, "Living in Another World", charted in the Top 40 in Germany, the Netherlands, Switzerland, Belgium and Italy (and just outside the Top 40 in the UK and France). By this time, all Talk Talk songs were being written by Hollis and Friese-Greene. The extended line-up for the 1986 tour consisted of Hollis, Webb and Harris, plus John Turnbull (guitars), Rupert Black and Ian Curnow (keyboards), Phil Reis and Leroy Williams (percussion), and Mark Feltham (harmonica). Most notable among these concerts was their appearance at the Montreux Jazz Festival, 11 July 1986, released on DVD in 2008 as Live at Montreux 1986.

1987–1991: Experimental period 

The success of The Colour of Spring afforded the band a bigger budget and schedule for the recording of their next album. Over a year in the making, and featuring contributions from many outside musicians, Spirit of Eden was released in 1988, on EMI's Parlophone label. The album was assembled from many hours of improvised instrumentation that Hollis and Friese-Greene had edited and arranged using digital equipment. The result was a mix of rock, jazz, classical, and ambient music. Critically praised, the album reached the UK Top 20 and was certified Silver by the BPI for sales of over 60,000 copies. The band announced they would not be attempting to recreate the album live (since, according to Hollis, "People would just want to hear the songs as they are on the album and for me that's not satisfying enough"). Without touring or music videos or singles as the band intended, there was little marketing left that the record company could do; in the end the band grudgingly agreed to a video for the remixed version of "I Believe in You", released as first single. Hollis, though, was unhappy with the video, as he made clear in an interview with Q Magazine: "I really feel that [the video] was a massive mistake ... I thought just by sitting there and listening and really thinking about what it was about, I could get that in my eyes. But you cannot do it. It just feels stupid. It was depressing and I wish I'd never done it."

During the making of Spirit of Eden, Talk Talk manager Keith Aspden had attempted to free the band from their record contract with EMI. Relations between the band and label continued to degrade after the album's release, eventually culminating in litigation brought by Aspden which extracted the band from their EMI contract. In 2011, Aspden clarified the conditions surrounding the dispute: "in essence our motivation in the court case with EMI was all about money and an opportunity to secure a better deal with another record company. EMI in our view had misinterpreted the meaning of the clause which specified when they should exercise their option. They lost the case on appeal." EMI then sued the band, claiming that Spirit of Eden was not "commercially satisfactory", but the case was thrown out of court. Webb left the band in late 1988.

With the band now released from EMI, the label released the retrospective compilation Natural History in 1990. It peaked at number 3 on the UK album chart and was certified Gold by the BPI for sales of over 100,000 copies. It was also an international success and eventually went on to sell more than 1 million copies worldwide. The 1984 single "It's My Life" was also re-released, and this time became the band's highest charting single in their native country, reaching number 13 on the UK Singles Chart. A re-release of the single "Life's What You Make It" also reached the Top 30. Following up on this renewed popular interest in the band, the label then released History Revisited in 1991, a compilation of new remixes, which made the UK Top 40 (it also reached the Top 30 in Germany and the Top 75 in the Netherlands). The band sued EMI for releasing the remixed material without their permission.

By 1990 the band had essentially morphed into a vehicle for the studio recordings of Hollis and long-term collaborator Friese-Greene, along with session musicians (including long-term Talk Talk drummer Harris). The group signed a two-album contract with Polydor Records and released Laughing Stock on Polydor's Verve Records imprint in 1991.  Laughing Stock crystallised the experimental sound the band started with Spirit of Eden (which has been retroactively categorised as "post-rock" by some critics). Even more minimalist than its predecessor, Laughing Stock reached just No. 26 on the UK Albums Chart.

Post break-up 

After Laughing Stock, Talk Talk disbanded in 1991; Hollis said that he wished to focus on his family. Paul Webb rejoined Lee Harris, and the two went on to form the band .O.rang, while Tim Friese-Greene started recording under the name Heligoland. In 1998, Mark Hollis released his self-titled solo début Mark Hollis, which was much in keeping with the minimalist post-rock sound of Spirit of Eden and Laughing Stock, but he retired from the music industry shortly afterwards.

Webb also collaborated under the name of Rustin Man with Portishead lead singer Beth Gibbons and released Out of Season in 2002, Drift Code in 2019 and Clockdust in 2020. Harris also featured on the Bark Psychosis 2004 album, ///Codename: Dustsucker.

Mark Hollis died on 25 February 2019, aged 64.

Legacy and influence 
Talk Talk's influence upon musicians has exceeded the band's visibility among the general public. Along with the band Slint, Talk Talk are credited with inventing "post-rock" in their last two albums, Spirit of Eden and Laughing Stock. The artists who have praised the band or cited them as an influence include Pearl Jam's Jeff Ament, Tears for Fears, Matthew Good, Radiohead, Doves, Elbow, Shearwater, M83, Bark Psychosis, The Notwist, Cedric Bixler-Zavala of the Mars Volta, Steven Wilson of Porcupine Tree, Storm Corrosion (a joint project between Opeth's Mikael Åkerfeldt and Porcupine Tree's Steven Wilson), Steve Hogarth of Marillion, Richard Barbieri of Japan and Porcupine Tree, and Death Cab for Cutie.

The bands Placebo, Weezer, the Divine Comedy and the Gathering covered their song "Life's What You Make It" and No Doubt scored a global hit with a cover of "It's My Life" in 2003 which reached number 20 on the UK charts. Lights recorded a cover of "Living in Another World"  Guy Garvey of the band Elbow said: "Mark Hollis started from punk and by his own admission he had no musical ability. To go from only having the urge, to writing some of the most timeless, intricate and original music ever is as impressive as the moon landings for me."

A tribute album and anthological book, both titled Spirit of Talk Talk, were released in 2012. The book includes all the artwork James Marsh did for the band, and hand-written lyrics (by the band). The album includes covers by various artists, proceeds going to the conservation organisation BirdLife International.

On Tuesday 26 November 2019, Spirit of Talk Talk organised A Celebration of Mark Hollis and Talk Talk concert at the Royal Festival Hall, London, UK. Founding band member Simon Brenner, who played keyboards on studio album, The Party's Over was amongst the long list of guest musicians who performed songs from all five Talk Talk studio albums and Mark Hollis' solo album. The evening was described as A Majestic Tribute by the London-based daily newspaper The Evening Standard.

In March 2020, a documentary about Talk Talk was screened for the first time at the Copenhagen International Documentary Film Festival. Entitled In a Silent Way, filmed before Mark Hollis' death and without the participation of the main band members, it pays tribute to the musical journey and integrity of Talk Talk. In September 2021, the film won the prize for best music documentary awarded by the jury of the Musical Ecran festival in France.

Hollis and Talk Talk continue to be praised as artists who did not cave in to the pressures of corporate and commercial interests. Says Alan McGee, "I find the whole story of one man against the system in a bid to maintain creative control incredibly heartening."

Discography 

 The Party's Over (1982)
 It's My Life (1984)
 The Colour of Spring (1986)
 Spirit of Eden (1988)
 Laughing Stock (1991)

References

External links 

 

1981 establishments in England
1991 disestablishments in England
English art rock groups
English post-rock groups
Musical groups from London
Musical groups established in 1981
Musical groups disestablished in 1991
British synth-pop new wave groups
English new wave musical groups
English synth-pop groups
Second British Invasion artists